is a female J-pop artist and actress. She was born in Higashimurayama, Tokyo, and debuted as a member of the J-Pop duo Wink. She began working as a solo artist on 1 April 1996, one month after Wink dissolved. She collaborated with Kaori Iida from Morning Musume for one DVD and one photobook in 2004. She got married in 2008 and in 2012, she gave birth to her first child, a girl.

Discography

Albums
 Delphinium (mini album, outside Wink) (25 May 1992)
 Joia  (25 May 1996)
 Luz  (25 May 1997)
 Paris, je t'aime d'amour (29 January 2003)
 To Pathos (27 November 2003)

Singles
 "I Julia" (20 January 1996)
 "Joia" (25 April 1996)
 "Hadaka de Nemurimasho" (25 August 1996)
 "Yurikago wo Yusurarete" (2 May 1998)
 "Konya Dake Kitto" (with Stardust Revue) (15 May 2000)
 "Kureta no Shiroi Suna" (28 April 2004)

Compilations
 C'est mon na – Best of Shoko Aida (30 January 2002)

DVD
 Aegekai – Shoko Aida & Kaori Iida (4 February 2004)

Filmography 
 Pride (1998), directed by Shunya Itō
 The Man in White (2003), directed by Takashi Miike
 Hana and Alice (2004), directed by Shunji Iwai
 Rainbow Song (2006), directed by Naoto Kumazawa, produced by Shunji Iwai
 Tokyo Ghoul (2017), directed by Kentarō Hagiwara
 Liar × Liar (2021), directed by Saiji Yakumo
 Scroll (2023), directed by Yasuhiko Shimizu

References

External links 
 Blue Star : Shoko Aida Official Site
 Twitch Film on Niji No Megami

1970 births
Japanese actresses
Japanese women pop singers
Japanese idols
Japanese television personalities
Living people
Singers from Tokyo
People from Higashimurayama, Tokyo
20th-century Japanese women singers
20th-century Japanese singers
21st-century Japanese women singers
21st-century Japanese singers
Up-Front Group
Wink (duo)